WZFM (101.3 FM, "Z101.3") is a classic hits-formatted broadcast radio station licensed to Narrows, Virginia, serving Narrows and Giles County, Virginia. WZFM is owned and operated by Baker Family Stations.

References

External links
Classic Hits Z-101.3 Online

ZFM
Classic hits radio stations in the United States
Radio stations established in 1991